St. John's Church is a historic church at 700 Main Avenue in Brownwood, Texas. It is part of the Episcopal Diocese of Fort Worth in the Anglican Church in North America.

It was built in 1892 and added to the National Register of Historic Places in 1979 under the name St. John's Episcopal Church.

See also

National Register of Historic Places listings in Brown County, Texas
Recorded Texas Historic Landmarks in Brown County

References

External links
Official website

Former Episcopal church buildings in Texas
Anglican Church in North America church buildings in the United States
Churches on the National Register of Historic Places in Texas
Gothic Revival church buildings in Texas
Churches completed in 1892
19th-century Episcopal church buildings
Buildings and structures in Brown County, Texas
National Register of Historic Places in Brown County, Texas
Recorded Texas Historic Landmarks
Anglican realignment congregations